The village Bardihan known as Bardihan More, because here there are many trees of batbriksha so the nice name home of batbriksha. In this village there is a large population of Ahir who are called Yadav. Many honourable persons live here. This village is an example of social unity. All castes and religions live here happily. The new structured SUN temple is a great example of social unity.

Bardihan is a village in Nasriganj block of the Rohtas district of Bihar.

It is also known as Chawni (cant.), as during British rule it was Chawni for British Forces.

The latest feature of this village is the completed four-lane road from Gaya to Sarnath across here bhia Daudnagar.

Villages in Rohtas district